Northam is a town in the Australian state of Western Australia, situated at the confluence of the Avon and Mortlock Rivers, about  east-northeast of Perth in the Avon Valley. At the 2016 census, Northam had a population of 6,548. Northam is the largest town in the Avon region. It is also the largest inland town in the state not founded on mining.

History 
The area around Northam was first explored in 1830 by a party of colonists led by Ensign Robert Dale, and subsequently founded in 1833. It was named by Governor Stirling, probably after a village of the same name in Devon, England. Almost immediately it became a point of departure for explorers and settlers who were interested in the lands which lay to the east.

This initial importance declined with the growing importance of the nearby towns of York and Beverley, but the arrival of the railway made Northam the major departure point for prospectors and miners heading east towards the goldfields.

A number of older buildings have heritage significance and still serve the community.

Camps and centres

Northam Migrant Accommodation Centre 
During the 1940s and 1950s in Northam there were extensive camps for displaced persons and immigrants from continental Europe.

The Northam Migrant Accommodation Centre closed in September 1951. It had been the first place of residence in Western Australia for approximately 15,000 immigrants from the Baltic states, Hungary, Poland, Czechoslovakia, Italy, Yugoslavia, Ukraine, Belarus and Bulgaria. 
During the peak immigration period, Northam had the largest immigrant receiving facilities within the State and the third largest in Australia. By 1950, the camp housed 4,000 people and two new blocks of huts were built to accommodate them all. By May 1954, 23,000 migrants had passed through the Northam Camp once the Accommodation Centre had closed. A significant number of these post-war arrivals eventually settled in the Northam area.

Yongah Hill Immigration Detention Centre
On 18 October 2010 the Yongah Hill (YHIDC) centre was announced as being established at the former Northam Army Training Camp. It was not opened until early 2012, however, and, after it was downsized from the original 1500 expected occupancy, talk of expansion has been happening.

It is run by Serco for the Department of Home Affairs.

Australian Border Force officers are also present at the centre.

In September 2018 a riot broke out at the centre and some buildings were set on fire, after a detainee was reportedly found in his cell injured after a suicide attempt. The detainee, who was a refugee, later died.

Also in September 2018, a guard was alleged to have sexually assaulted a detainee.

Geography
The town and hinterland of Northam are located in the Avon Valley - so named after the river the Avon River. It has been periodically flooded, and man-made banks protect the town from inundation.  The Avon is a name commonly used by organisations, newspapers and sporting groups.

Burlong Pool a pool just south of the town was known as the Burlong swimming pool, and in the 1890s the location of the source of water for the Goldfields water trains.

Climate
Northam has a Mediterranean climate (Köppen Csa) with hot dry summers and cool wet winters.

2011 
A severe thunderstorm lashed the town and surrounding areas on 27 January 2011 resulting in roofs being ripped off, trees being uprooted and power lines being brought down.
About 50 houses were damaged in the town as a result of the storm but no injuries were reported.

Government
For many years Northam consisted of the Town of Northam and Shire of Northam. After 53 years of debates and attempts, these two councils merged on 1 July 2007 to form one new council called the Shire of Northam.

The public sector is a large employer for many residents of Northam and surrounding areas. With many state government departments operating out of the town.

Services Australia operates a Centrelink office in the town.

Tourism
Northam has a number of tourist attractions, including hot air ballooning, wineries, cafes and restaurants, museums, hotels and motels.

Transport
Northam is connected to Perth via coach services N3 and N5, and rail services Prospector and MerredinLink provided by Transwa.

Railways

Northam is a major railway junction, and serves as the commercial centre for much of the western Wheatbelt. The dual gauge Eastern Railway terminates here and becomes the standard gauge Eastern Goldfields Railway. Narrow gauge radiates both south of the town to York and beyond (Great Southern Railway), and north to Goomalling, another rural railway junction.

Current railway station
Northam railway station is served by Transwa's AvonLink, MerredinLink and Prospector rural train services, and Great Southern Rail's Indian Pacific to Sydney.

Original railway station
The original station on Fitzgerald Street was opened in 1900 and closed in 1966 when the new Eastern Railway route became operational.

The layout of the pre-1966 narrow gauge railway also had a busy junction at East Northam; this was removed on the completion of the new standard gauge railway.

Avon Yard
The Western Australian Government Railways originally created it as the Avon Marshalling Yard, and more recent operators in the yards such as Australian Railroad Group have named it the Avon Yard.

Airport and roads

Education

Northam has a senior high school that conducts classes from Year 7 to Year 12.
It also has 3 public primary schools  Northam Primary School, West Northam Primary School and Avonvale Primary School  that conduct classes from kindergarten to Year 6.

Northam has a private Catholic school, St Josephs, which provides an alternative to public schools. St Josephs conducts classes from kindergarten to Year 12.

Central Regional TAFE has a campus located near the senior high school.

Sport
Association Football (Soccer) has been played in Northam since just after World War Two. Due to the many European immigrants living at the Holden Camp a league was formed comprising nine teams from Northam and one from Wundowie.  Many of the teams were based on ethnicity such as: Italian; Dutch; Polish; Hungarian; Romanian; Yugoslav; Austrian; German and Bulgarian. In recent years, Northam United FC was a men's team whilst Northam Springfield FC is a children's football club in its tenth season (2021). Springfield play in the winter against their rivals Toodyay Junior Soccer Club.

Northam has some very committed sporting teams. Australian rules football is an obsession with many of the people of Western Australia. Northam has two teams that play in the Avon Football Association competition, Federals and Railways.

Field and indoor hockey, cricket, and netball also attract significant numbers of players and spectators. Individual sports such as tennis and cycling including BMX are also popular.

The BMX State Championships were held in Northam in 2003 with 3,000 competitors and spectators attending the event for over a week with Northam competitors showing their dominance in the sport in the state. Three local riders who participated in this event (Dale Reynolds - then ranked 3WA for 18 Men's, Chris Marris - then ranked 1WA for 18 Men's, and Kyle Martin - then ranked 4WA for 18 Men's) have subsequently completed cross country rides from Adelaide to Perth demonstrating the interest in cycling in Northam.

Steve Fossett became the first person to fly around the world alone, non-stop, in a hot air balloon when he launched from Northam on 19 June 2002, and returned to Australia on 3 July, landing in Queensland.

In July 2016 Russian adventurer and balloon pilot Fedor Konyukhov took off from Northam airfield to attempt a solo nonstop round the world balloon flight. He completed his circumnavigation, covering , in 11 days, 4 hours and 20 minutes, beating Fossett's record by 52 hours.

Between 1952 and 1956 several motor racing events were held using streets within the town. The first circuit used was on the south side of the Avon River, but this was considered too dangerous, so a new circuit was built in 1956 on the north side of the river.

Thoroughbred horse racing is held at Northam Racecourse by the Northam Race Club. The track held its first race in 1863 and has about 22 race meetings during the year.

The town is also home to harness racing and greyhound racing.

Events 
The annual Avon Descent river race starts in Northam.

The Northam Flying 50's, a historical car racing event, is held each year in early April, attracting around 5,000 spectators.

The Northam Agricultural Show is held annually on a Friday and Saturday in mid-September.

The Kep Ultra running race is held each year on the Western Australia Day long weekend in early June. The race starts in Northam and includes 100 km and 75 km events finishing at Mundaring Weir.

Military history
During World War I, Wilberforce, an area on the Spencers Brook to York Road was the area set up for the breeding and selection of horses to be transported to overseas theatres of war involving Australian horseman in particular the iconic 10th Light Horse Regiment.

Also in November 1920, an area at Noggojerrring was purchased by the Federal Government for £7,000. It was an area of 875 acres(350 hectares) of farming land and was located four miles (6.5 kilometres) north of Northam on the Northam - Pithara Road. Of that area, 860 acres (344 hectares) were cleared and divided into 11 paddocks. The property was well watered, and carried a wind mill, two dwellings, three sheds, and a stable. The Goomalling railway bisected it. The Federal Government's purpose was the settlement of tubercular soldiers. The place was christened Anzac Farm.

During World War II, Northam was the location of a number of important strategic military camps, depots and installations being the most concentrated of military activity areas in Western Australia. Due to its strategic geographical location and being close to water, the Goldfields Water Supply Scheme, close to strategic railway junction, as it was close to the coast but inland, Northam became an important military hub.

The installations, camps, and depots were some of those developed in the Wheatbelt during 1939–1945, located within the Shire of Northam, some of which still exist today.

 Northam Army Camp including the 38th Camp Hospital, training and hospital
 6 Commonwealth Ammunition Depot (6CAD) to become 51 Supply Company, Springhill, ammunition storage
 US Navy 7 Naval Ammunition Depot (7 NAD), Springhill, torpedo storage
 RAAF No 10 Inland Aircraft Fuel Depot (RAAF 10IAFD), Burlong, aircraft fuel storage
 Muresk Agricultural College, Muresk, intelligence
 Australian Army 7th Supply Depot (7SD), Spencers Brook, food, clothing storage and distribution
 RAAF No 6 Replenishment Centre, Muresk, ammunition storage
 118th Australian General Hospital (118 AGH), Northam, hospital, later to become 71 Camp Hospital
 Werribee Army Camp, near Wundowie, transport and anti-tank
 RAAF Meenaar, Meenaar, RAAF airstrip

Notable people
Northam is the birthplace of the following people:

Politics
 Kim Edward Beazley (1917–2007), federal government minister
 Ian Laurance (born 1940), state government minister
 Carmen Lawrence (born 1948), state premier and federal government minister
 Ken McIver (1928–1988), state government minister
 Frederick Henry Piesse (1853–1912), state government minister
 Ian Pratt (born 1937), state upper-house member
 David Templeman (born 1965), state government minister

Sport
 Arnold Byfield (1923–2015), first-class cricketer, WAFL and VFL footballer
 Leon Davis (born 1981), AFL footballer
 Bruce Duperouzel (born 1950), first-class cricketer, WAFL and VFL footballer
 Cruize Garlett (born 1989), AFL footballer
 Jasmin Stewart (born 1998), AFLW player

 Darren Glass (born 1981), AFL footballer
 Robbie Haddrill (born 1981), AFL footballer
 Eric Glass (1910–1985), WAFL, VFL, and VFA footballer
 Geoff Marsh (born 1958), Test cricketer
 Ashley McGrath (born 1983), AFL footballer
 Cory McGrath (born 1979), AFL footballer
 Stephen Milosz (1955–2022), first-class cricketer
 Harry Morgan (1889–1956), WAFL, VFL, and SANFL footballer
 Alistair Smith (born 1990), AFL footballer
 Brennan Stack (born 1988), AFL footballer
 Bobby Hill (Australian footballer) (born 2000)-AFL Footballer
 Sydney Stack (born 2000)- AFL Footballer 
 Deven Robertson- (born 2001)- AFL Footballer
Others
 Ben Carlin (1912–1981), first to circumnavigate the world in an amphibious vehicle
 Elizabeth Backhouse (1917–2013), novelist, scriptwriter and playwright
 Kate Leeming, explorer, ultra-distance cyclist and Australian Real Tennis champion
 Ragnar Garrett (1900–1977), Australian Army officer
 Hugo Throssell (1884–1933), Victoria Cross recipient

See also
 Muresk Institute

Notes

Further reading
 Peters, Nonja, and Fiona Bush and Jenny Gregory The Holden Immigration Camp, Northam Nedlands, W.A. Centre for Western Australian History; East Perth, W.A: distributed by the Heritage Council, 1993. Nonja Peters
 2001: ‘Milk and Honey but no Gold’.  by Dr. Nonja Peters.  Published 2001 by University of Western Australia Press.  ISBN  1 876268 56 5
 2010: ‘We came by Sea’,  Western Australian Museum. ISBN  978 1 920843 62 5
 2006: ‘The Dutch Down-Under’ 1606–2002, Crawley: UWA Press.
 2016: ‘A Touch of Dutch: Maritime, Military, migration and Mercantile connections with the Western Third , Nonja Peters (coordinating author), Carina Hoang Communications.  ISBN  978 0987158444 
 2011: Selling a dream - expectation versus reality – post-war Dutch and other migration to Australia 1945 – 1970, AEMI Journal Volume 8, pp. 49-63.
 2010: Dutch Australians At A Glance: Acknowledging the Past, Preserving the Present and Future, AEMI Journal Volume 7, pp. 42-49.
 2010: N. Peters, ‘The Dutch migration to Australia: sixty years on’ in M. Schrovner and M van Faassen eds Its Time to Burn the Wooden Shoes in Tijdschrift voor Sociale en Economische Geschiedenis, Year 7, No. 2.
 1996: Arriving in the Lucky Country' in On the Homefront: Western Australia and World War II, Jenny Gregory (ed.), University of Western Australia Press, Perth, 1997 pp. 257–264.

External links
History of Northam www.westaustralianvista.com. Retrieved 17 September 2006.
Official Northam town website. Retrieved 17 September 2006.

 
Towns in Western Australia
Avon River (Western Australia)
Shire of Northam